The 2014 Singapore Cup is the 17th season of Singapore's annual premier club football tournament organised by Football Association of Singapore. Due to sponsorship reasons, the Singapore Cup is also known as the RHB Singapore Cup. Home United are the defending champions, having won the trophy six times.

Balestier Khalsa won the Cup with a 3-1 win over defending champion Home United.

Teams

A total of 16 teams participate in the 2014 Singapore Cup. Eleven of the teams are from domestic S.League and the other five are invited from the Philippines, Cambodia and Laos. Courts Young Lions will not participate in this year's edition of Singapore Cup.

S.League Clubs
  Albirex Niigata (S)
 Balestier Khalsa
  DPMM FC
 Geylang International
  Harimau Muda B
 Home United
 Hougang United
 Tampines Rovers
 Tanjong Pagar United
 Warriors FC
 Woodlands Wellington
  Young Lions

Invited Foreign Teams
  Global FC
  Loyola Meralco Sparks
  Nagacorp FC
  SHB Champasak
  Svay Rieng

Format

The sixteen teams were drawn into two distinct pools for the preliminary round. They will play against one another in a single-legged knockout basis. Winners of this round will progress and advance to the quarter-finals. Thereafter, matches are played in two legs with the exception of the one-match finals.  Unlike the previous season, away goals rule does not apply.

For any match in the knockout stage, a draw after 90 minutes of regulation time is followed by two 15 minute periods of extra time to determine a winner. If the teams are still tied, a penalty shoot-out is held to determine a winner.

Knockout phase

Bracket

Preliminary round
In the preliminary round, teams were drawn into two distinct pools. They will play against one another in a single leg knockout basis. The draw for the preliminary round was held on 3 May 2014. The matches will played from 25 May to 1 June 2014. Winners of this round will progress and advance to the quarter-finals.

Pool A

Quarter-finals

|}

Semi-finals

|}

Third place play-off

Final

Statistics

Goalscorers

5 goals

  Roy O'Donovan (DPMM)

4 goals

  Rodrigo Tosi (DPMM)

3 goals

  James Younghusband (LMS)

2 goals

  Kazuki Sakamoto (ALB)
  Kazuya Okazaki (ALB)
  Goran Ljubojević (BAL)
 Hafiz Nor (GLI) 
  Lee Kwan-woo (HOM)
 Qiu Li (HOM)
  Alfredo Razon Gonzalez (LMS)
  Phil Younghusband (LMS)
 Jamil Ali (TAM)
  Jozef Kapláň (TAM)
  Miljan Mrdaković (TAM)
 Noh Alam Shah (TAM)
  Monsef Zerka (TPU)

1 goal

  Kazuya Fukuzaki (ALB)
  Keisuke Ota (ALB)
  Norihiro Kawakami (ALB)
  Kim Min-ho (BAL)
  Park Kang-Jin (BAL)
 Zulkiffli Hassim (BAL)
  Azwan Ali (DPMM)
  Azwan Saleh (DPMM)
  Robert Alviž (DPMM)
  Shahrazen Said (DPMM)
 Aliff Shafaein (GLI)
  Joaquin Lopez (GLI)
 Khairulnizam Jumahat (GLI)
 Leonel Felice (GLI)
 Mustaqim Manzur (GLI)
 Ahmed Fahmie (HOM)
 Fazli Ayob (HOM)
 Fazrul Nawaz (HOM)
 Indra Sahdan Daud (HOM)
 Yasir Hanapi (HOM)
  Ramzi Sufian (HMB)
  Itubu Imbem (CHP)
 Anaz Hadee (TAM)
 Firdaus Idros (TPU)
  Sébastien Etiemble (TPU)
  Miroslav Pejić (WAR)
  Chang Jo-yoon (WLW)

Own goals
  Sonxay Simoulay (against Loyola Meralco Sparks)

Source: S.League

Hat-tricks

Discipline
The following players are currently suspended from tournament matches:

References

External links
 Official S.League website
 Football Association of Singapore website

2014
2014 domestic association football cups
Cup